Henry James William Finn (June 17, 1787 Sydney, Nova Scotia - January 13, 1840 Long Island Sound) was a Canadian-American actor and author.

Biography
He went to England in his youth, on the invitation of a rich uncle residing there, who died without making any provision for him, and he was obliged to resort to the stage for a support. After a few years he returned to New York City, subsequently revisited England, and in 1822 made his first appearance at the Federal Street Theatre in Boston. He was one of the most popular actors on the stage, his forte being broad comedy.

He perished in the conflagration of the steamboat Lexington. He accumulated a competency, and was on his way to his residence in Newport, Rhode Island, at the time of his death.

Works
He enjoyed a considerable reputation as a humorous writer, and published a Comic Annual and a number of articles in the periodicals. He published a drama entitled "Montgomery, or the Falls of Montmorenci," which was acted with success, and he left besides a manuscript tragedy.

References

1787 births
1840 deaths
American male stage actors
American humorists
American male dramatists and playwrights
Pre-Confederation Canadian emigrants to the United States
19th-century American dramatists and playwrights
19th-century American male writers